Biking For Barnardos was a motorcycle circumnavigation of the world in aid of Barnardos undertaken by Kurtis Murphy and David Snelling in 2008.

Overview
Beginning on 14 June 2008, Murphy and Snelling set off from the statue of Eric Morecambe in Morecambe, Lancashire, England to circumnavigate the world by motorcycle. their route took them through France, Belgium, Netherlands, Germany, Poland, Czech Republic, Slovakia, Ukraine, Russia (three times), Kazakhstan, Mongolia and the USA. They returned to Morecambe on 4 October 2008, having successfully completed the circumnavigation.

Citing inspiration from Ted Simon's Jupiter's Travels and Ewan McGregor and Charley Boorman's Long Way Round. The route they followed is similar (but not identical to) the route of Long Way Round, however, unlike Long Way Round, there was no support crew and a very modest budget.

Bikes
Snelling and Murphy rode identical Suzuki V-Strom 650 motorcycles with few modifications apart from luggage. Because of their tight budget, they did not use off road tyres at any point.

External links

http://www.bikingforbarnardos.com/
https://web.archive.org/web/20110718164115/http://www.suzuki-gb.co.uk/onroad/news/000845/

Long-distance motorcycle riding